Nhavi is a cast village in Yawal taluka in Jalgaon district in the state of Maharashtra, India.

Demographics
The residents of Nhavi are mostly from the Leva Patil caste, with many Muslims, Koli,Tadvi bhil, Buddhists, Parashi and Pavari. The Leva community is prevalent in the area of Nhavi. Nhavi is covered with 8 temples, viz Vithhal, Swaminarayan, Durga Devi, Manu Devi, Khanderav, Lord Ram, Lord Shiva & Hanumaan (Raj Rajeshwar Mahadev Mandir) and so on. Holi festival is the specialty of Nhavi and is famous for God Khanderav.

According to the census conducted in 2011, by the Ministry of Home Affairs, the total population reported was 12,782 and 3,143 Households. It shows 6,549 males and 6,233 female population out of which 1,442 are under the age of 6 years.  The literacy level noted in the survey was near 95 percent. Pincode of Nhavi village is 425524.

Education 
There are 9 major academic institutes in Nhavi:

 Bharat Vidyalaya Nhavi
 Shetki Basic Shala Nhavi
 Marathi Mulinchi Shala Nhavi
 G P Madhyamik Nhavi
 Sharada Vidyalaya Nhavi
 Urdu anglu High school Nhavi
 J T Mahajan Primary School Nhavi
 J T Mahajan Polytechnic College Nhavi
 J T Mahajan College of Engineering Nhavi
 J T Mahajan Industrial Training Institute Nhavi
 J T Mahajan College of M E

J. T. Mahajan College of Engineering is one of the "A" grade educational institute in the Nhavi area. It caters all the hardworking students across the country.

Industry
The main livelihood of the residents is farming, with bananas as the prevalent crop. Madhukar Sahakari Sakhar Karkhana (Sugar Factory) is situated near village and most of the people work there. The main market is Weekly market that opens on Monday 2.00 pm to 6.00 pm where farmers sell vegetables to the villagers. People from neighboring villages like Marul, Talegaon, Kalmoda, Hambardi, Borkheda also buy & sell in this weekly market.

Media
Majority of local newspapers are published from Jalgaon, namely Deshdoot, Deshonnati, Lokmat etc.

References
https://all-pincodes.com/pincode-of-Nhavi%20B.O-is-425524

External links
http://www.censusindia.gov.in
https://data.gov.in

Villages in Jalgaon district